Kalimantsi (also written Kalimantzi, Kalimanci; or Калиманци in Cyrillic) may refer to:

 In Bulgaria:
 Kalimantsi, Blagoevgrad Province - a village in Sandanski municipality, Blagoevgrad Province
 Kalimantsi, Varna Province, a village in Suvorovo municipality, Varna Province
 In the Republic of Macedonia:
 Kalimanci, Vinica, a village in Vinica Municipality